Rebeca Pazo (born ) is a Spanish female former volleyball player, playing as an outside hitter. She was part of the Spain women's national volleyball team. 

She competed at the 2007 Women's European Volleyball Championship. On club level she played for AD Pinguela in 2007.

References

External links
 
 
 http://rio2016.fivb.com/en/news/venezuela-women-to-head-to-debut-olympics?id=62855

1983 births
Living people
Spanish women's volleyball players
Place of birth missing (living people)